Judge Ginger Lerner-Wren (born 29 July 1959, Brooklyn, New York) is a county court judge in the Criminal Division of the 17th Judicial Circuit, Broward County, Florida. She is an adjunct professor, Nova Southeastern University, Criminal Justice Institute, Doctoral (On-line).

Early life and career

Judge Lerner-Wren graduated from the University of Miami, BA, Politics and Public Affairs (1980), and from the Nova Southeastern University School of Law, JD (1983). In 1996, Judge Lerner-Wren was elected to the 17th Judicial Circuit of Florida.

Formerly with the Florida Advocacy Center for Persons with Disabilities, Judge Lerner-Wren was asked to oversee the implementation of a consent decree, as monitor, on behalf of the plaintiffs in a class action affecting treatment conditions and the adequacy of community based treatment of care for discharges at South Florida State Hospital. Judge Lerner-Wren was asked to serve in this position due to her expertise in serving persons with disabilities through her court service as Public Guardian of the 17th Judicial Circuit of Florida.

Appointed by Chief Circuit Judge Dale Ross in 1997, Judge Lerner-Wren was responsible for directing and administering all operations of the Broward County Office of Public Guardian. She was legally responsible for the health, safety and welfare of disabled and indigent adults, all of whom were adjudicated, legally incapacitated, and in need of a legal guardian and case management support in the community. Appointed by the Probate Court, Judge Lerner-Wren was responsible for administering the program, including social, housing, and economic matters, and evaluating levels of care for the clients. Further, Judge Lerner-Wren was responsible for the oversight of treatment plans and worked collaboratively with community based senior mental health, related social service agencies, and a wide array of long term care facilities. She routinely assisted and consulted with Broward County Adult Protective Services regarding abuse and neglect matters.

Judge Lerner-Wren was assigned to the Broward County Court Criminal Division in January 1997. Judge Lerner-Wren's regular criminal court responsibilities include the administration of a full regular criminal misdemeanor division, including presiding over all dockets, pretrial motions, probationary matters and jury trials.

Broward County Mental Health Court 

Within months of taking the bench, in what has been recognized as a historic administrative order (dated 22 June 1997), Judge Lerner-Wren was appointed by Chief Judge Dale Ross to administer and preside over the Nation's first Mental Health Court. Judge Lerner-Wren is responsible for leading and coordinating this specialized criminal, problem solving, diversionary court to address the complexities of mentally ill offenders arrested on nonviolent misdemeanor offenses and to improve the administration of justice for those with serious mental health and psychiatric disorders.

The Broward County Mental Health Court, dedicated to the safe diversion and treatment of the mentally ill, has been featured on Good Morning America, National Public Radio, and CNN, and covered by news media reports and articles nationally and internationally. The Broward County Mental Health Court was recommended as a preventative court strategy by Human Rights Watch, Special Report, "Ill Equipped", 2003.

Judge Lerner-Wren and staff from the Broward County Mental Health Court have received numerous honors and recognition related to the innovation of the Court, the application of Therapeutic Jurisprudence, and for the humanitarian treatment of persons with severe mental illness.

The Broward County Mental Health Court, through its application of Therapeutic Jurisprudence, is recognized as best practice and showcased at The White House Conference on Mental Health in 1999. It was the model for the Federal Legislation passed by Congress in 2000 in comprehensive Mental Health Act to promote Mental Health Courts nationwide (Mentally Ill Offender Treatment and Crime Reduction Act of 2000). The Council of State Governments (Justice Center) is tasked with the implementation of this legislation, known as the Consensus Project.

Judge Lerner-Wren was appointed by former President George W. Bush to serve on the President's New Freedom Commission on Mental Health in 2002. She served as Chair of The Criminal Justice Sub-Committee.

Judge Lerner-Wren speaks nationally and internationally on wide variety of topics, including problem-solving courts, cultural change leadership, mental health courts, therapeutic jurisprudence, and legal innovation.

In addition, The Broward Mental Health Court has been honored for its pioneering innovation in human rights for persons with mental illness and related disorders in the criminal justice system. In December 2013, The HiiL Foundation (The Hague, Netherlands) selected Judge Ginger Lerner-Wren and Broward's Mental Health Court 'Top Finalist' - 2013 Innovating Justice Awards.

In March 2018, Judge Lerner-Wren will publish A Court of Refuge - a book that tells the story of how the court grew from an offshoot of her criminal division held during lunch hour without the aid of any federal funding, to a revolutionary institution that has successfully diverted more than 20,000 people with serious mental illness from jail and into treatment facilities and other community resources.

Memberships/Boards/Honors 

 Member of the Florida Bar.
 Member of the Broward County Bar Association.
 National Council for Behavioral Health - Award of Excellence in Advocacy for Official Public Service, 2015.
 Founding Member, International Therapeutic Jurisprudence Society.
 United Way of Broward County, Board of Governors, Commission on Substance Use and Prevention.
 Executive Committee, National Action Alliance for Suicide Prevention.
 Broward Behavioral Health Coalition (Criminal Justice Advisory Board)
 Top Finalist (Successful Innovation), Innovating Justice Awards 2013, The Hague Institute for the Internationalization of Law (HiiL Foundation), The Hague, Netherlands
 Member of the Broward Behavioral Health Coalition (Criminal Justice Advisory Committee), 2012.
 Member of the Broward County National Alliance on Mental Illness (NAMI).
 Former Board Director, Florida Initiative For Suicide Prevention.
 Former Judges Advisory Board, University of Miami, School of Law, Therapeutic Jurisprudence Institute.
 Honorary 'Bellringer", Mental Health Center of Broward, 2008.
 National Advisory Council, Substance Abuses and Mental Health Services Administration (SAMHSA), 2003-2007.
 Chair, The Criminal Justice Sub-Committee, President's New Freedom Commission on Mental Health, 2001-2003.
 Nova Southeastern University, College of Psychology, Humanitarian Award, 2001.
 EPIC Award Mental Health Association of Broward, 2000.
 Broward County Women's Hall of Fame, 2000.

Publications 
For full list of publications, click here. Highlights include:

 Problem Solving Justice: Reducing Recidivism And Promoting Public Safety. Nova Law Review Online Journal, Winter 2014.
 Don't Miss the Chance to Impact Justice. Huffpost Healthy Living, 16 June 2013.
 Mental Health Courts. Annals of Health Law, Vol. 19, Issue 3, Spring 2010.
 Justice Speaks - Applying Therapeutic Jurisprudence (TJ) In A Court Of General Jurisdiction, Guest Column. The Arizona Journal of International and Comparative Law, May 2008
 Mental Health Courts. Contributor - Chapter:5: Slate, Risdon, Johnson, Wesley, "The Criminalization of Mental Illness: Crisis and Opportunity for the Justice System". Carolina Academic Press, 2008.
 Face to Face. A Conversation With Judge Ginger Lerner-Wren. Opinion and Editorial, Sun Sentinel, 2005
 Do Juveniles Facing Civil Commitment Have a Right to Counsel: A Therapeutic Jurisprudence Brief. Winick, B, Lerner-Wren, G., 17 U.Cinn L. Rev. 115-126 (2002).
 Bridging the Gap: America and Other Perspectives. Lerner-Wren, Dinerstein, Winick, Bliss, New York Law School Journal of International and Comparative Law, Vol. 21/ 3 (2002)
 A Court for the Nonviolent Defendant with a Mental Disability. Psychiatric Annals, "Lerner-Wren & Appel, Vol 31, No. 7, July 2001. published by SLACK, Inc. 6900 Grove Road, Thorofare, NJ 08086, 856-848-1000.
 The Broward Mental Health Court: A Preliminary Report. Court Review, The Journal of American Judges Association, Volume 37, Issue 4, Winter 2001. The National Center for State Courts.
 Contributing Editor CRI Publications, Community Mental Health Report.
 Study Site, National Center for Courts "Court Responses to Individuals in Need of Services", Promising Components of a Service coordination Strategy for Courts, 2001.
 Model Court Site:  Monograph "Emerging Judicial Strategies for the Mentally Ill in the Criminal
 Caseload:  Mental Health Courts", U.S. Department of Justice. (1999).

References

External links 
 The President's New Freedom Commission on Mental Health, 2002
 Mental Health Judge to Give Talk at Florida Southern College, 2003
 
 Sun Sentinel: Face to Face: A Conversation with Judge Ginger Lerner-Wren, 30 January 2005
 International Network on Therapeutic Jurisprudence: Justice Speaks - Applying Therapeutic Jurisprudence in a Court of General Jurisdiction, May 2008
 National Disability Authority (Ireland) Conference Luncheon Remarks presented by Judge Ginger Lerner-Wren, October 2008
 Boston university - Center for Psychiatric Rehabilitation: Free Webinar on Psychiatric Rehabilitation in Mental Health Courts, 2010
 Nova Southeastern University, Shepard Broad Law Center ("Wounds of War - Symposium on Veterans and Service Members with PTSD"), Moderator, Court Response, February 2013

1959 births
Living people
American women judges
University of Miami alumni
Nova Southeastern University alumni
21st-century American women